"Can't You Hear Me Knocking" is a track by English rock band the Rolling Stones from their 1971 album Sticky Fingers. The track is over seven minutes long, and begins with a Keith Richards open-G tuned guitar intro.  The main song lasts for two minutes and 43 seconds, after which it transforms into an extended improvisational jam. The entire track was captured in one take, with the jam being a happy accident; the band had assumed the tape machine had been stopped, and were surprised to find the entire session had been captured.  Originally they were going to end the song before the jam started, but were so pleased with the jam that they decided to keep it in.  Besides the regular Rolling Stones members Mick Jagger (vocals), Keith Richards (guitar), Mick Taylor (guitar), Charlie Watts (drum), and Bill Wyman (bass), the track also features conga player Rocky Dijon, saxophonist Bobby Keys, organist Billy Preston, pianist Nicky Hopkins and additional percussion by producer Jimmy Miller.

Composition and recording

The track featured Rocky Dijon on congas; tenor saxophonist Bobby Keys performs an extended saxophone solo over the guitar work of Richards and Mick Taylor, punctuated by the organ work of Billy Preston. At 4:40 Taylor takes over from Richards and carries the song to its finish with a lengthy guitar solo.

Richards described writing the guitar riff:

In 2002, Richards commented on the recording:

Taylor recalled in a 1979 interview:

Taylor added, "I used a brown Gibson ES-345 for 'Dead Flowers' and the solo on 'Can't You Hear Me Knocking'."

Jagger noted in the Spotify Landmark interview on the album that the key was too high for his voice and that "I [did] lots of vocals, harmonies to sort of hide the fact that I didn't really hit the notes that great in the chorus bits."

An early alternate take of the song (with dummy/placeholder lyrics) was released in June 2015 on the Deluxe and Super Deluxe editions of the reissued Sticky Fingers album.

Accolades
In 2004, Rolling Stone magazine listed it at number 25 on its list of "The 100 Greatest Guitar Songs of All Time."

The Rolling Stones live performances
The number was part of the Rolling Stones' concert repertoire during their Licks Tour in 2002–2003 and A Bigger Bang Tour in 2005–2007. In these renditions, Jagger played a harmonica solo after Keys' sax solo, and Ronnie Wood performed the extended guitar solo. A live recording was released on the band's 2003 DVD set Four Flicks and on the 2004 concert album Live Licks. It was also performed live during shows in 2013, with Mick Taylor appearing as a special guest with the band. Another live version was published on the release Sticky Fingers Live - From The Vault, recorded on 20 May 2015 at the Henry Fonda Theater in Los Angeles, California, where the band played the entire Sticky Fingers album.

Personnel

Sticky Fingers
The Rolling Stones
 Mick Jaggerlead vocals
 Keith Richardslead guitar, backing vocals
 Mick Taylorrhythm guitar, lead guitar, backing vocals
 Bill Wymanbass guitar
 Charlie Wattsdrums

Additional musicians
 Rocky Dijoncongas
 Bobby Keyssaxophone
 Billy Prestonorgan
 Nicky Hopkinspiano
 Jimmy Millerpercussion

Live Licks
The Rolling Stones
 Mick Jaggervocals, harmonica
 Keith Richardsguitar
 Ronnie Woodguitar
 Charlie Wattsdrums

Additional musicians
 Darryl Jonesbass
 Chuck Leavell keyboards
 Bobby Keyssaxophone

References

External links
Complete Official Lyrics

1971 songs
Songs written by Jagger–Richards
The Rolling Stones songs
Song recordings produced by Jimmy Miller
Atlantic Records singles
Songs about drugs